"Warum nur, warum?" ("Just why, why?") was the  entry in the Eurovision Song Contest 1964, sung in German by Udo Jürgens.
"Warum nur, warum?" was succeeded as the Austrian representative in the Eurovision Song Contest 1965 by "Sag ihr, ich lass sie grüßen" ("Tell her, I send my love"), also performed by Jürgens.

The song was performed sixth on the night (following 's Lasse Mårtenson with "Laiskotellen" and preceding 's Rachel with "Le chant de Mallory"). At the close of voting, it had received 11 points, placing sixth in a field of 16.

Background
The song is in the chanson style and features Jürgens wondering why bad things need to happen, such as flowers dying and the object of his affections ignoring him.

The song was recorded in English (first by Matt Monro, with later versions by Brenda Lee with Richard Williams, Peter Grant, Al Martino, Nancy Wilson and Timi Yuro among others), in Italian and in Spanish as "Vete por favor" by Matt Monro, on each occasion featuring similar sentiments.

Following the contest,  representative Matt Monro had a hit with his English-language version of "Warum nur, warum?", entitled "Walk Away" (lyrics by Don Black, with whom Monro attended the Eurovision contest). Monro came second in the 1964 Eurovision Song Contest with the Tony Hatch song,  "I Love the Little Things".

Chart performance

Matt Monro version

External links
Lyrics to "Warum nur, warum" at The Diggiloo Thrush website

References 

1964 songs
Songs about depression
Eurovision songs of Austria
Eurovision songs of 1964
Songs written by Udo Jürgens